The 1969 Tampa Spartans football team represented the University of Tampa in the 1969 NCAA College Division football season. It was the Spartans' 33rd season. The team was led by head coach Fran Curci, in his second year, and played their home games at Tampa Stadium in Tampa, Florida. They finished with a record of eight wins and two losses (8–2). The Spartans opened the season with a loss at Akron before they went on an eight-game winning streak. They then closed the season with a loss against Florida A&M in the season finale.

Schedule

References

Tampa
Tampa Spartans football seasons
Tampa Spartans football